Synergos is a non-profit organization which aims to reduce global poverty through partnerships between government, business, civil society and local communities.

History 

Peggy Dulany founded Synergos in 1986.  Synergos is headquartered in New York City and has regional offices in Latin America and Southern Africa.

Syngergos' "Global Philanthropists Circle" is an international network of philanthropists focused on global poverty.

See also 
 Rockefeller Foundation
 Rockefeller family

References

External links
Synergos website

Non-profit organizations based in New York (state)
Development charities based in the United States
1986 establishments in New York (state)